The name Marshman is a family, or surname which originated in England and either refers to an occupation - namely a person whose job it was to work the marshes or it is derived from their residency possibly of Marsham in Norfolk, or in Mersham in Kent. There is a strong settlement of the Marshman family in Wiltshire, especially near Dilton Marsh.

Today in East Anglia, in England, workers known as Marshmen continue to collect reeds and rushes for the thatching industry.

Spelling variations include:

Amarshan
Marsham
Marshan
Marshania
Marshom,
Marshon

The name might apply to:

People
 Arthur A. J. Marshman (1929–1997), English architect
 Bobby Marshman (1936–1964), American racing driver
 D. M. Marshman, Jr. (1922–2015), American screenwriter
 General Sir Henry Marshman Havelock-Allan (1830–1897), British soldier and politician
 Hannah Marshman (1767–1847), English missionary
 Jack Marshman, (1989-Present), Mixed martial artist
 John Clark Marshman (1794–1877), English journalist and historian
 Joshua Marshman (1768–1837), English missionary
 Marshman Edward Wadsworth (1847–1921), American geologist and educator
 Victoria Marshman, contestant on America's Next Top Model, Cycle 9

Occupational surnames
English-language occupational surnames